P19 Allsvenskan is the highest level of men's association football for Swedish under-19 teams, and determines the under-19 (or junior) Swedish championships. The title has been officially contested since 1982 in different formats, IFK Göteborg being the most successful team with nine titles.

History
The junior championships for club teams (also  or ) for boys have been played since 1982, but the competition had several unofficial precursors. A cup tournament, was played from 1945 to 1976, and was open to member clubs of the Swedish Professional Football Leagues. The title unofficial junior champions was awarded to the winners of the tournament, which was discontinued when the newspaper Expressen withdrew their sponsorship. For the years between 1949 and 1958, the winner of this cup also played a national final against the winners of the Norrland junior championships.

The Swedish Professional Football Leagues also arranged a league starting in 1971, only open to youth teams of Allsvenskan clubs. A champion was decided through a final match between group winners, and was open to all Swedish Professional Football Leagues members from 1977. This league was sometimes also called , and saw continued play in parallel to the in 1982 introduced official junior championships, initially played in a strict cup format.

The championship is played in league format, currently named , until 2021 consisting of two regional groups, followed by a final between the two winning teams to determine the junior champions. From 2022, the league format has been changed to consist of a single group of 14 teams with no play-off.

From 1982 until 2008, the championships were played with an age limit of 18, but from 2009 on the age limit has been 19.

Format
The competition is played in a single league, round-robin format of 14 teams since 2022. Players are eligible to play if they are at most 19 years old on the 31 December of the season year.

Teams
:
AIK
BK Häcken
Djurgårdens IF
GAIS
Halmstads BK
Hammarby IF
Helsingborgs IF
IF Brommapojkarna
IFK Göteborg
IFK Norrköping
Malmö FF
Västerås SK
Örebro SK
Östers IF

Previous winners

Performances

Citations

References

Football leagues in Sweden
Youth football in Sweden
1982 establishments in Sweden
Sports leagues established in 1982
Sweden